Joey Muha is a Canadian drummer, best known for his YouTube videos, many of which have millions of views and have been featured on multiple websites. He is a member of the industrial metal band Threat Signal, death metal band Jungle Rot. and pop band Liteyears. He has also played for bands associated with Nuclear Blast Records, Victory Records, MapleMusic Recordings, etc.

Biography 
Muha grew up in a small beach town in Southern Ontario named Port Dover. He started playing drums around the age of 14 and has been playing in bands ever since. He initially started playing with his older brother, Willie, and has since moved on to different bands. He was taught by his local drum teacher, Adam Reid, for a brief period and then continued on his own. He has been recognized as covering a wide variety of genres and styles of drumming.

History 
Muha played with the band Our Lady of Bloodshed from 2009 through 2014. From 2011 through 2014 he played with Hamilton, Ontario progressive death metal band OPTICS, recording on their self-released self-titled EP in 2011.

Muha got his first taste of U.S. touring while playing drums with Victory Records artist Farewell to Freeway during their 2011 U.S. tour.

In 2012 Muha joined Nuclear Blast Records death metal band Threat Signal. During this time he also played with Cornwall, Ontario metalcore band Cynicist, appearing in their 2013 music video for "Ashes Remain," and filling in throughout their 2014 East coast tour.

In June 2015 Muha announced that he would leave Threat Signal to join the ranks of Victory Records death metal artist Jungle Rot full-time, immediately after which the band began recording their Eighth studio album, Order Shall Prevail, featuring Muha on the drums. Muha spent the summer of 2015 playing with Jungle Rot on the Victory Records stage for the entirety of the 2015 Rockstar Energy Drink Mayhem Festival.

In August 2015, Muha announced his departure from Jungle Rot. Muha has since returned to playing with Threat Signal, as well as with Sumo Cyco.

Muha's equipment 
Muha is currently endorsed by Vic Firth Drumsticks, MEElectronics, Protection Racket, Gibraltar Hardware and Sabian Cymbals. He uses Yamaha Drums, Vic Firth Drumsticks, Sabian Cymbals, Trick Pedals, Gibraltar Hardware, MEEaudio monitors and Yamaha electronics.

Current tour kit 
Drums Yamaha Recording Custom Series Kit
10"X9" Tom
12"x10" Tom
16"x14" Floor Tom
18"x16" Floor Tom
22"x18" Bass Drum
14"x5.5" Snare Drum
Cymbals Sabian and Zildjian
14" Sabian HHX Stage Hi Hats
16" Sabian HHX Stage Crash
17" Sabian HHXplosion Crash
18" Sabian AAX Chinese
18" Sabian AAX Chinese Brilliant
19" Sabian AAX Dark Crash
20" Zildjian Scimitar Ride
Drumheads – Evans
Toms: EC2 Clear
Bass: EMAD
Snare: Genera HD-Dry batter – Hazy 300 Clear resonant
Other
Roland TD-3 Electronic Percussion Module and RT-10 trigger
Trick Dominator Pedals
Vic Firth X5BN American Hickory drumsticks
MEEaudio M6 PRO monitors

References

External links 
 

Canadian male drummers
1992 births
Living people
21st-century Canadian drummers
21st-century Canadian male musicians